Police ranks of India

Superintendent of Police, also known as Deputy Commissioner in Police Department is a senior rank in the Indian Police Service (IPS). They wear a star and an Ashoka emblem on their epaulettes with 'IPS' below. The larger and more important districts in India are headed by a senior superintendent of police (SSP), while smaller district are headed by a superintendent of police (SP). 

Below SP, there are additional superintendent of police (Additional SP) and deputy superintendent of police (DySP/DSP). A DySP who is in-charge of a sub-division is also called Sub-divisional police officer (SDPO). In the state of Kerala, superintendents of police in charge of police districts are called District Police Chiefs.

Commissionerate system

Many important cities in India have the commissionerate system of police rather than an SP-led police system. In this system, the head of the police department is called the commissioner of police (CP). While the superintendent of police (SP) is called a deputy commissioner of police (DCP).